Horná Poruba is a village and municipality in Ilava District in the Trenčín Region of north-western Slovakia.

History
In historical records the village was first mentioned in 1335.

Geography
The municipality lies at an altitude of 402 metres and covers an area of 13.691 km². It has a population of about 1,093 people.

Genealogical resources

The records for genealogical research are available at the state archive "Statny Archiv in Bytca, Slovakia"

 Roman Catholic church records (births/marriages/deaths): 1831-1895 (parish A)

See also
 List of municipalities and towns in Slovakia

References

External links

Surnames of living people in Horna Poruba

Villages and municipalities in Ilava District